Robinson Township is a township in Brown County, Kansas, USA.  As of the 2000 census, its population was 452.

Geography
According to the USGS, it contains two cemeteries: Rose Hill and Ununda.

The streams of Buttermilk Creek, Middle Fork Wolf River and South Fork Wolf River run through this township.

References
 USGS Geographic Names Information System (GNIS)

External links
 US-Counties.com
 City-Data.com

Townships in Brown County, Kansas
Townships in Kansas